Le Transloy is a commune in the Pas-de-Calais department in the Hauts-de-France region of France.

Geography

Population

Places of interest
 The church of St.Nicholas, rebuilt along with the rest of the village, following World War I.
 A memorial to 800 French soldiers killed during fighting around Bapaume, in 1914.

See also
Communes of the Pas-de-Calais department
Battle of Le Transloy

References

Transloy